is an action-adventure anime television series created by Tatsunoko Productions in partnership with Topcraft. The series was broadcast on Fuji TV and various other local stations across Japan from October 3, 1976, to September 11, 1977, and lasted 50 half-hour episodes. The series director was Hiroshi Sasagawa, of Speed Racer and Tokimeki Tonight fame.

Story
On his birthday, Paul receives a teddy bear as a gift from his parents. While Pakkun appears to be a fairly ordinary stuffed toy, he in reality is the keeper of the portal between Earth and an alternate dimension known as the Land of Wonders. Paul and his best friend Nina  explore the alternate universe until Nina is kidnapped by the demonic ruler of this dimension, Belt Satan. After making an unsuccessful attempt to save Nina, Paul and Pakkun are forced to return home to Earth, where Paul is confronted by Nina's parents, who blame him for her disappearance and accuse him of murdering her. Paul returns to the Land of Wonders with Pakkun and Nina's dog Doppe in tow, fighting monsters with his powerful yo-yo in order to defeat Belt Satan and save Nina.

Distribution
The series has been dubbed into several other languages including Italian (as Il fantastico mondo di Paul, 1980), Spanish (as Las aventuras de Paul), Korean, Polish (as Fantastyczny świat Paula), Bulgarian (as Вълшебният Свят на Пол) and in English in the Philippines (as Paul in Fantasy Land).

Broadcast information

Staff
 Director: Hiroshi Sasagawa
 Episode Direction: Mizuho Nishikubo, Hidehito Ueda
 Screenwriters: Jinzo Toriumi, Yu Yamamoto
 Planning: Jinzo Toriumi, Shigeru Yanagawa
 Created by: Tatsuo Yoshida
 Character Designs: Akiko Shimamoto, Mitsuki Nakamura
 Art Director: Mitsuki Nakamura
 Animation Director: Hayao Nobe
 Music: Shunsuke Kikuchi
 Animation Production: Tatsunoko Production, Topcraft
 Production: Tatsunoko Production Co., Ltd. / Fuji TV

Cast
 Paul: Sumiko Shirakawa
 Nina: Keiko Yokozawa
 Pakkun: Yoko Asagami
 Belt Satan: Toru Ohira
 Doppe: Isamu Tanonaka
Filipino Characterization (in English)
 Paul        - Paul
 Nina        - Nina
 Pakkun      - Moses
 Belt Satan  - The Black Giant
 Doppe       - Bernard

References

External links
 
 Paul's Miraculous Adventures at Tatsunoko Productions' English website
 Paul no Miracle Daisakusen at Tatsunoko Productions (Japanese)

1976 anime television series debuts
Adventure anime and manga
Fuji TV original programming
Tatsunoko Production
Topcraft